Kebri Beyah (also spelled Kebribeyah, Qebri Beyah, Qabribayah, Somali: Qabribayax) is a town in southeastern Ethiopia. It is the administrative center of Kebri Beyah.

Overview
Kebri Beyah comprises a number of smaller villages (Dhurwale, Guuyow, Dhalaandhiga, Quraan, Salbane, Qaha, Gilo, Horoqalifo, Horohawd, Campka Rayad).  There are also many valleys in the surrounding area (Fadayga, Godanta, Eegato, Dulcad, Qotorooble, Goljano, Hartasheekh, Alaybaday, Durya Dibiile, Farda, Garbile, Danaba, Dubur, and Toga Jarer).

Kebri Beyah has been the site of a refugee camp since 1989. The camp originally housed about 10,000 refugees and returnees from Somalia,  It was the only camp in the Somali Region to remain open while the United Nations High Commissioner for Refugees (UNHCR) was able to close down the other camps in the region between 1997 and 2005. By 2005, the UNHCR expected to close the Kebri Beyah camp soon as well. However, the greater influx of refugees from south-central Somalia led to the growth of the camp up to 16,000 or 17,000 inhabitants. In 2007, 4,000 refugees were relocated from Kebri Beyah to Teferi Ber where a former camp was partially re-opened.

Demographics 
Based on figures from the Central Statistical Agency in 2005, Kebri Beyah has an estimated total population of 13,192 .

The 1997 census reported this town had a total population of 8,840 of whom 4,805 were men and 4,035 women. The three largest ethnic groups reported in this town were the Somali (99%), the, all other ethnic groups made up the remaining 1.72% of the residents.

Notes 

Populated places in the Somali Region